Jireh may refer to:

Jereh Rural District, a rural district (dehestan) in Jereh and Baladeh District, Kazerun County, Fars Province, Iran
Jereh (Iranian village), a village of the Jereh Rural District
Jireh Ibañes (born 1982), a Filipino basketball player
"Jireh" (song), a 2021 song by Elevation Worship and Maverick City Music
Jireh International Pty Ltd, a holding company that franchises Gloria Jean's Coffees
Jireh Swift Billings, son of Franklin S. Billings, Jr.

See also
Jehovah-jireh, a place in the book of Genesis
Jira (disambiguation)
Jereh (disambiguation)